Dolenji Leskovec ( or) is a settlement west of Brestanica in the Municipality of Krško in eastern Slovenia. The area is part of the traditional region of Styria. It is now included with the rest of the municipality in the Lower Sava Statistical Region.

Name
The name of the settlement was changed from Dolnji Leskovec to Dolenji Leskovec in 1990. It was known as Haselbach in German in the past.

Cultural Heritage
There is a small chapel-shrine in the settlement dedicated to the Sacred Heart of Jesus. It was built in the early 20th century.

References

External links
Dolenji Leskovec on Geopedia

Populated places in the Municipality of Krško